Felipe Reinaldo Rojas Pavez (born 2 March 1986) is a Chilean footballer. 

He currently played for Santiago Morning.

Notes

References

 
 

1986 births
Living people
Chilean footballers
Cobreloa footballers
Deportes Colchagua footballers
O'Higgins F.C. footballers
Chilean Primera División players
Association football midfielders
People from Rancagua